The 1950 East Tennessee State Buccaneers football team was an American football team that represented East Tennessee State College (ETSC)—now known as East Tennessee State University—as a member of the Smoky Mountain Conference and the Volunteer State Athletic Conference (VSAC) during the 1950 college football season. Led by fourth-year head coach Loyd Roberts, the Buccaneers compiled an overall a record of 3–5–1, with marks of 1–2–1 against Smoky Mountain opponents and 0–1–1 in VSAC play. This was the program's first losing record under Roberts and the first losing season since 1941. The team's co-captains were Mark Sutherland and Bob "Snake" Evans. The 1950 squad beat local rival . They also tied  in the final meeting between the two rivals as Milligan dropped football after the season. One of the few bright spots of the year was the transfer of Hal Morrison from Tennessee, as he became a record-setting target over the next three seasons. This was the first Buccaneer football team to receive athletic scholarships after the players had gone on strike the previous year.

Schedule

References

East Tennessee State
East Tennessee State
East Tennessee State Buccaneers football seasons
East Tennessee State Buccaneers football